Robert Stack (born Charles Langford Modini Stack; January 13, 1919 – May 14, 2003) was an American actor. Known for his deep voice and commanding presence, he appeared in over forty feature films. He starred in the highly successful ABC television series The Untouchables (1959–1963), for which he won the 1960 Primetime Emmy Award for Outstanding Performance by an Actor in a Series, and later hosted/narrated the true-crime series Unsolved Mysteries (1987–2002). He was also nominated for an Academy Award for Best Supporting Actor for his role in the film Written on the Wind (1956). Later in his career, Stack was known for his deadpan comedy roles that lampooned his dramatic on-screen persona, most notably as Capt. Rex Kramer in Airplane! (1980).

Early life 
He was born Charles Langford Modini Stack in Los Angeles, California, but his first name, selected by his mother, was changed to Robert by his father. He spent his early childhood in Adria and Rome, becoming fluent in French and Italian at an early age, and did not learn English until returning to Los Angeles when he was seven.

His parents divorced when he was a year old, and he was raised by his mother, Mary Elizabeth (née Wood). His father, James Langford Stack, a wealthy advertising agency owner, later remarried his mother, but died when Stack was 10.

He always spoke of his mother with the greatest respect and love. When he collaborated with Mark Evans on his autobiography, Straight Shooting, he included a picture of himself and his mother that he captioned "Me and my best girl". His maternal grandfather,  opera singer Charles Wood, studied voice in Italy and performed there under the name "Carlo Modini." Stack had another opera-singer relative: American baritone Richard Bonelli (born George Richard Bunn), who was his uncle.

Stack took some drama courses at the University of Southern California, where he played on the polo team. Clark Gable was a family friend.

By the time he was 20, Stack had achieved minor fame as a sportsman. He was an avid polo player and shooter. His brother and he won the International Outboard Motor Championships, in Venice, Italy, and at age 16, he became a member of the All-American Skeet Team. He set two world records in skeet shooting and became national champion. In 1971, he was inducted into the National Skeet Shooting Hall of Fame. He was a Republican.

The Piikani Nation of the Blackfoot Confederacy, which was known as the Peigan Nation before the 1990s, honored him by inducting him into their chieftainship in 1953 (July 2, 1953, Newspaper) as Chief Crow Flag. In 1962, Stack received the Golden Plate Award of the American Academy of Achievement.

Career 
Stack took drama courses at Bridgewater State University, a mid-sized liberal-arts school located 25 miles southeast of Boston. His deep voice and good looks attracted the attention of producers in Hollywood.

Universal 
When Stack visited the lot of Universal Studios at age 20, producer Joe Pasternak offered him an opportunity to enter the business. Recalled Stack, "He said, 'How'd you like to be in pictures? We'll make a test with Helen Parrish, a little love scene.' Helen Parrish was a beautiful girl. 'Gee, that sounds keen,' I told him. I got the part."

Stack's first film, which teamed him with Deanna Durbin, was First Love (1939), produced by Pasternak. This film was considered controversial at the time, as he was the first actor to give Durbin an on-screen kiss.

Stack won critical acclaim for his next role, The Mortal Storm (1940) starring Margaret Sullavan and James Stewart, and directed by Frank Borzage at Metro-Goldwyn-Mayer. He played a young man who joins the Nazi party.

Back at Universal, Stack was in Pasternak's A Little Bit of Heaven (1940), starring Gloria Jean, who was that studio's back-up for Deanna Durbin. Stack was reunited with Durbin in Pasternak's Nice Girl? (1941).

Stack then starred in a Western, Badlands of Dakota (1942), co-starring Richard Dix and Frances Farmer.

United Artists borrowed him to play a Polish Air Force pilot in To Be or Not To Be (1942), alongside Jack Benny and Carole Lombard. Stack admitted he was terrified going into this role, but he credited Lombard, whom he had known personally for several years, with giving him many tips on acting and with being his mentor. Lombard was killed in a plane crash shortly before the film was released.

Stack played another pilot in Eagle Squadron (1942), a huge hit. He then made a Western, Men of Texas (1942).

World War II 
During World War II, Stack served as an officer in the United States Navy. He worked as an aerial gunnery instructor and rose to the rank of lieutenant.

Postwar career 
Stack resumed his career after the war with roles in such films as Fighter Squadron (1948) at Warner Bros. with Edmond O'Brien, playing a pilot; A Date with Judy (1948) at MGM, with Wallace Beery and Elizabeth Taylor.

Stack was in two films at Paramount: Miss Tatlock's Millions (1948) and Mr. Music (1950). He had an excellent role in Bullfighter and the Lady (1951), a passion project of Budd Boetticher for John Wayne's company. He later said this was the first time he liked himself on screen.

Stack supported Mickey Rooney in  My Outlaw Brother (1951) and had the lead in the adventure epic Bwana Devil (1952), considered the first color, American 3-D feature film. It was released by United Artists, which also put Stack in a Western, War Paint (1953). He continued making similar low-budget action fare: Conquest of Cochise (1953) for Sam Katzman; Sabre Jet (1953), playing another pilot, this time in the Korean War; The Iron Glove (1954), a swashbuckler where Stack played Charles Wogan, for Katzman.

Return to "A" movies 
Stack was back in "A" pictures when he appeared opposite John Wayne in The High and the Mighty (1954), playing the pilot of an airliner who comes apart under stress after the airliner encounters engine trouble. The film was a hit, and Stack received good reviews. In 1954, he signed a seven-year contract with Fox.

Sam Fuller cast him in the lead of House of Bamboo (1955), shot in Japan for 20th Century Fox. He supported Jennifer Jones in Good Morning, Miss Dove (1955), also at Fox, and starred in Great Day in the Morning (1956) at RKO, directed by Jacques Tourneur.

Written on the Wind 

Stack was then given a role in Written on the Wind (1956), directed by Douglas Sirk and produced by Albert Zugsmith. Stack played another pilot, the son of a rich man who marries Lauren Bacall, who in turn falls for his best friend, played by Rock Hudson. The movie was a massive success and Stack was nominated for an Academy Award for Best Supporting Actor; Dorothy Malone, who played Stack's sister, was nominated for Best Supporting Actress. Malone won, but Stack lost, to Anthony Quinn. Stack felt that the primary reason he lost to Quinn was that 20th Century Fox, which had lent him to Universal-International, organized block voting against him to prevent one of their contract players from winning an Academy Award while working at another studio.

Stack was reunited with Hudson, Malone, Zugsmith, and Sirk on The Tarnished Angels (1957), once more playing a pilot. At Fox, he was in The Gift of Love (1958) with Bacall.

Stack then was given a real star role, playing the title part in John Farrow's biopic, John Paul Jones (1959). Despite a large budget and an appearance by Bette Davis, it was not a success.

The Untouchables 

Stack portrayed the crimefighting Eliot Ness in the ABC television drama series The Untouchables (1959–1963) produced by Desilu Productions, in association with Stack's Langford Productions. The show portrayed the ongoing battle between gangsters and a special squad of federal agents in prohibition-era Chicago. "No one thought it was going to be a series," Stack once said, "When you tell the same story every week, it seemed like a vendetta between Ness and the Italians."

The show won Stack the Primetime Emmy Award for Outstanding Lead Actor in a Drama Series at the 12th Primetime Emmy Awards in 1960.

During the series' run, Stack starred in a disaster movie, The Last Voyage (1960), appearing opposite Malone. At Fox, he was in The Caretakers (1963) with Joan Crawford and he appeared in a special on hunting, The American Sportsman. He owned 25% of The Untouchables and The Caretaker.

After The Untouchables,  Stack worked in Europe for Is Paris Burning? (1966), The Peking Medallion (1967), Action Man (1967), and later for Story of a Woman (1970). He did Laura (1967) on film.

The Name of the Game 
Stack starred in a new drama series, rotating the lead with Tony Franciosa and Gene Barry in the lavish The Name of the Game (1968–1971). He played a former federal agent turned true-crime journalist, evoking memories of his role as Ness.

In 1971, he sued CBS for $25 million for appearing in the documentary The Selling of the Pentagon, saying that the company had misrepresented his position regarding the Vietnam War.

1970s career 
Stack played a pilot in the TV movie Murder on Flight 502 (1975) and was the lead in the series Most Wanted (1976), playing a tough, incorruptible police captain commanding an elite squad of special investigators, also evoking the Ness role. He later did a similar part in the series Strike Force (1981).

He made a film in France, Second Wind (1978).

Comedy actor and later career 

Stack parodied his own persona in the comedy 1941 (1979). His performance was well received and Stack became a comic actor, appearing in Airplane! (1980), Big Trouble (1986), Plain Clothes (1988), Caddyshack II (1988), Joe Versus the Volcano (1990), Beavis and Butt-Head Do America (1996), and BASEketball (1998). He also provided the voice for the character Ultra Magnus in The Transformers: The Movie (1986).

In a more serious vein, he appeared in the action movie Uncommon Valor (1983), the television miniseries George Washington (1984), and Hollywood Wives (1985), and appeared in several episodes of the primetime soap opera Falcon Crest in 1986.

Stack's series Strike Force was scheduled opposite Falcon Crest, where it quickly folded. 

He began hosting Unsolved Mysteries in 1987. He thought very highly of the interactive nature of the show, saying that it created a "symbiotic" relationship between viewer and program, and that the hotline was a great crime-solving tool. Unsolved Mysteries aired from 1987 to 2002, first as specials in 1987 (Stack did not host all the specials, which were previously hosted by Raymond Burr and Karl Malden), then as a regular series on NBC (1988–1997), then on CBS (1997–1999) and finally on Lifetime (2001–2002). Stack served as the show's host during its entire original series run. Netflix revived the series in July 2020 with a six-episode run. Paying homage to the late host, a silhouette of Stack can be seen towards the end of the opening credits.

In 1991, Stack voiced the main police officer Lt. Littleboy (who is also the main protagonist and narrator) in The Real Story of Baa Baa Black Sheep.

In 1996, a Golden Palm Star on the Palm Springs, California, Walk of Stars was dedicated to him.

Personal life and death 

Stack was married to actress Rosemarie Bowe from 1956 until his death. They had two children, a son, Charles, and a daughter, Elizabeth.

He underwent radiation therapy for prostate cancer in October 2002, and died of heart failure at his home in Bel Air, Los Angeles, on May 14, 2003, at the age of 84.

Filmography

Film

Television

Radio appearances

Books 
 Straight Shooting (with Mark Evans) (1980); 
 Shotgun Digest (Jack Lewis, Editor) (1974);

See also 
 William H. Perry (Los Angeles), his great-grandfather

References

External links 

 
 Robert Stack at Find a Grave

1919 births
2003 deaths
20th-century American male actors
21st-century American male actors
American male film actors
American male television actors
American male voice actors
American people of Italian descent
Audiobook narrators
United States Navy personnel of World War II
Television personalities from Los Angeles
Bridgewater State University alumni
California Republicans
Male actors from Los Angeles
Military personnel from California
Outstanding Performance by a Lead Actor in a Drama Series Primetime Emmy Award winners
United States Navy sailors
University of Southern California alumni
Deaths from organ failure